Deborrea cambouei is a species of bagworm moth native to Madagascar.

Biology
The length of the bag of the male is 35mm, the wingspan of male adults is 28mm.
it is known from Imerina and a known flight period is December.

See also
 List of moths of Madagascar

References
 

Psychidae
Moths described in 1922
Moths of Madagascar